Crimewatch Solved was a BBC television series that was a spin-off from the BBC's Crimewatch. The first episode aired on BBC One in 1999 and was presented by Nick Ross. The final episode aired in September 2010 and was presented by Matthew Amroliwala.

History
First aired on 10 August 1999, a new yearly programme called Crimewatch Solved was transmitted. It was the fourth spin-off from the main Crimewatch programme. Originally presented by Nick Ross, the series includes cases, features and reports of crimes which resulted in convictions.

Aside from 2002, a new edition was broadcast every year until 2010, when the thirteenth and final edition aired on 1 September 2010. Occasionally, episodes would review an entire high-profile case, such as an edition dedicated solely to the murder of Sarah Payne.

Transmissions

See also
 Crimewatch

References

External links

1990s British crime television series
2000s British crime television series
2010s British crime television series
1999 British television series debuts
2010 British television series endings
BBC crime television shows
Solved
English-language television shows